Same-sex marriage has been legal in Hidalgo since 11 June 2019. A bill for the legalization of same-sex marriages in Hidalgo was approved by the state Congress on 14 May 2019. It was published in the official state journal on 10 June and took effect the following day.

Legal history

Background

The Mexican Supreme Court ruled on 12 June 2015 that state bans on same-sex marriage are unconstitutional nationwide. The court's ruling is considered a "jurisprudential thesis" and did not invalidate state laws, meaning that same-sex couples denied the right to marry would still have to seek individual amparos in court. The ruling standardized the procedures for judges and courts throughout Mexico to approve all applications for same-sex marriages and made the approval mandatory. Specifically, the court ruled that bans on same-sex marriage violate Articles 1 and 4 of the Constitution of Mexico. Article 1 of the Constitution states that "any form of discrimination, based on ethnic or national origin, gender, age, disabilities, social status, medical conditions, religion, opinions, sexual orientation, marital status, or any other form, which violates the human dignity or seeks to annul or diminish the rights and freedoms of the people, is prohibited.", and Article 4 relates to matrimonial equality, stating that "man and woman are equal under the law. The law shall protect the organization and development of the family."

Due to the lack of legislative action, a collective amparo for six same-sex couples was filed with the Third District Court on 8 August 2014 to contest the constitutionality of articles 8, 11 and 143 of the Family Code. Article 8 described marriage as a "social and permanent institution between a man and a woman", and article 143 similarly defined concubinage as "between a man and a woman". Article 11 characterized marriage as an institution whose goal was "perpetuating the species". Almost two years later, in September 2016, the First Chamber of the Mexican Supreme Court declared that the articles violated the Constitution of Mexico, and gave the six couples the right to marry. Another amparo contesting the constitutionality of the three articles was filed in December 2014. In October 2016, Yolanda Molina Reyes, state coordinator of Equal Marriage Mexico (Matrimonio Igualitario México), said that within the past two years three separate amparos against the state had been filed, all of which had been successful in the courts. The first same-sex wedding in the state occurred in Pachuca on 8 October 2016. By August 2017, 8 amparos for same-sex marriage rights had been granted in Hidalgo.

Legislative action
As Mexico City and Coahuila had recently legalized civil unions, a similar measure was proposed in Hidalgo in July 2007. However, it stalled in the state Congress as well as in successive legislative sessions. In October 2013, Congress indicated that there was not sufficient "maturity" in society to accept same-sex marriage and that it would instead consider a bill to recognize same-sex cohabitation, but eventually no such partnership bill was approved by Congress.

The July 2018 general elections resulted in the National Regeneration Movement (MORENA), whose party platform includes support for same-sex marriage, winning the majority of legislative seats in the Congress of Hidalgo. In October 2018, a same-sex marriage bill was introduced to Congress by Deputy Areli Rubí Miranda Ayala from the Party of the Democratic Revolution (PRD). It was approved on 14 May 2019 in a vote of 18–2 with 8 abstentions. Governor Omar Fayad signed the bill into law on 24 May. It was published in the official state journal on 10 June 2019 and took effect the following day. The law ensures that married same-sex couples enjoy the same rights, benefits and responsibilities as married opposite-sex couples, including tax benefits, immigration rights, property rights, inheritance, adoption rights, etc. Article 8 of the Family Code now reads as follows:

in Spanish: 
(Marriage is a social and permanent institution, in which the legal union of two people is established, who, with equal rights and obligations, seek respect, equality and mutual aid, the birth and stability of a family and the realization of a full and responsible community of life.)

Marriage statistics
The National Institute of Statistics and Geography reported that 71 same-sex marriages were performed in Hidalgo in 2019, representing 0.78% of marriages.

Public opinion
A 2017 opinion poll conducted by Gabinete de Comunicación Estratégica found that 51% of Hidalgo residents supported same-sex marriage, while 46% were opposed.

According to a 2018 survey by the National Institute of Statistics and Geography, 42% of the Hidalgo public opposed same-sex marriage.

See also

 Same-sex marriage in Mexico
 LGBT rights in Mexico

Notes

References

Hidalgo (state)
Hidalgo
2019 in LGBT history